Joseph Milton Brown (September 17, 1902 – unknown) was a professional baseball player. A third baseman, he spent his career in minor league baseball from 1924 to 1937. He spent the majority of his career in the International League.

Brown was inducted in the International League Hall of Fame in 1962.

References

External links

1902 births
Year of death missing
Baseball third basemen
Reading Keystones players
Newark Bears (IL) players
Syracuse Stars (AA) players
Rochester Red Wings players
Jersey City Skeeters players
Buffalo Bisons (minor league) players
Toronto Maple Leafs (International League) players
Dallas Steers players
Knoxville Smokies players
Springfield Cardinals players
Rome Colonels players